Sweda is a surname. Notable people with the surname include:

Mick Sweda (born 1960), American musician
Joseph Sweda (1926–2015), American politician